Meredith McGeachie (born July 5, 1971) is a Canadian television and film actress.

Education 
McGeachie graduated from the theatre program at George Brown College.

Career 
She is most noted for her roles in the film Punch, for which she was a Genie Award nominee for Best Supporting Actress at the 24th Genie Awards, and her supporting television roles as Tonya in The L Word and Cate in Paradise Falls. She has also appeared in the films Free Fall, Bless the Child, Prince Charming and Horns, and the television series Earth: Final Conflict, Da Vinci's Inquest, Andromeda, Stargate: Atlantis, Ties That Bind and When We Rise.

At the Vancouver Film Critics Circle Awards 2002, McGeachie won for Best Supporting Actress in a Canadian Film for Punch.

Filmography

Film

Television

References

External links

Canadian film actresses
Canadian television actresses
Canadian stage actresses
Living people
20th-century Canadian actresses
21st-century Canadian actresses
Year of birth missing (living people)